Paul Bourgeois may refer to:

  (1898–1974), see 
 Paul Sablon, aka Paul Bourgeois (1888–1940), Belgium-born cinema pioneer and animal trainer